The 2022–23 NCAA Division I men's ice hockey season began on October 1, 2022, and is scheduled to conclude with the NCAA championship on April 8, 2023. This is the 75th season in which an NCAA ice hockey championship will be held, and is US college hockey's 129th year overall.

Conference realignment
On August 31, 2021, Alaska Anchorage announced that the $3 million fundraising goal had been reached and the team would return for the 2022-23 season.

On February 23, Lindenwood University announced that they would be promoting their athletic program to Division I for the 2022-23 academic year. Then on March 17, Lindenwood announced that they would promote their men's ice hockey team from club to Division I, which was confirmed the next day by university president John R. Porter. The formal announcement was made on March 24.

On April 5, Stonehill College announced that they would also promoting their athletic program to Division I for the 2022-23 academic year. Stonehill's hockey program previously competed as a member of the Division II Northeast-10 Conference. For the 2022-23 season, Stonehill's men's team will be an Independent with their women's team competing in the NEWHA.

Membership changes

Polls

Regular season

Season tournaments

Standings

PairWise Rankings
The PairWise Rankings (PWR) are a statistical tool designed to approximate the process by which the NCAA selection committee decides which teams get at-large bids to the 16-team NCAA tournament. Although the NCAA selection committee does not use the PWR as presented by USCHO, the PWR has been accurate in predicting which teams will make the tournament field.
	
For Division I men, all teams are included in comparisons starting in the 2013–14 season (formerly, only teams with a Ratings Percentage Index of .500 or above, or teams under consideration, were included). The PWR method compares each team with every other such team, with the winner of each “comparison” earning one PWR point. After all comparisons are made, the points are totaled up and rankings listed accordingly.
	
With 62 Division I men's teams, the greatest number of PWR points any team could earn is 61, winning the comparison with every other team. Meanwhile, a team that lost all of its comparisons would have no PWR points.

Teams are then ranked by PWR point total, with ties broken by the teams’ RPI ratings, which starting in 2013–14 is weighted for home and road games and includes a quality wins bonus (QWB) for beating teams in the top 20 of the RPI (it also is weighted for home and road).
	
When it comes to comparing teams, the PWR uses three criteria which are combined to make a comparison: RPI, record against common opponents and head-to-head competition. Starting in 2013–14, the comparison of record against teams under consideration was dropped because all teams are now under comparison.

Player stats

Scoring leaders

As of March 18, 2023

Leading goaltenders
The following goaltenders lead the NCAA in goals against average, minimum 1/3 of team's minutes played.

GP = Games played; Min = Minutes played; W = Wins; L = Losses; T = Ties; GA = Goals against; SO = Shutouts; SV% = Save percentage; GAA = Goals against average

As of March 5, 2023

Tournament bracket

Awards

NCAA

Atlantic Hockey

Big Ten

CCHA

ECAC Hockey

Hockey East

NCHC

See also
 2022–23 NCAA Division II men's ice hockey season
 2022–23 NCAA Division III men's ice hockey season

References

 
NCAA